Pontões Capixabas Natural Monument is a natural monument in the state of Espírito Santo, Brazil.

Location

The Pontões Capixabas Natural Monument lies in the Atlantic Forest biome.
It is in the municipalities of Águia Branca and Pancas in the state of Espírito Santo.

The terrain includes the escarpment of the Serra da Mantiqueira and part of the Jequitinhonha-Pardo plateau.
The streams are in the watershed of the Pancas River, a tributary of the Doce River.
The conservation unit holds a remnant of dense rainforest.

History

It was created as a national park by decree on 19 December 2002.
It became part of the Central Atlantic Forest Ecological Corridor, created in 2002.
Law 11.686 of 2 June 2008 changed the designation of the Pontões Capixabas National Park to the Pontões Capixabas Natural Monument.
The unit is administered by the Chico Mendes Institute for Biodiversity Conservation.
The conservation unit is classed as IUCN protected area category III (natural monument or feature).
The primary objective is to preserve the rocky features, the associated flora and fauna, and the landscape.
The cougar (Puma concolor) is a protected species in the unit.

Notes

Sources

Natural monuments of Brazil
Protected areas of Espírito Santo